196 (one hundred [and] ninety-six) is the natural number following 195 and preceding 197.

In mathematics
196 is a square number, the square of 14. As the square of a Catalan number, it counts the number of walks of length 8 in the positive quadrant of the integer grid that start and end at the origin, moving diagonally at each step. It is part of a sequence of square numbers beginning 0, 1, 4, 25, 196, ... in which each number is the smallest square that differs from the previous number by a triangular number.

There are 196 one-sided heptominoes, the polyominoes made from 7 squares. Here, one-sided means that asymmetric polyominoes are considered to be distinct from their mirror images.

A Lychrel number is a natural number which cannot form a palindromic number through the iterative process of repeatedly reversing its digits and adding the resulting numbers. 196 is the lowest number conjectured to be a Lychrel number in base 10; the process has been carried out for over a billion iterations without finding a palindrome, but no one has ever proven that it will never produce one.

See also
 196 (disambiguation)

References

Arithmetic dynamics
Integers